The 2015–16 Topklasse season was the sixth and last edition of the Dutch third tier since its inauguration in the current form in 2010. A total 32 teams participated in the league: 25 from the 2014–15 Topklasse, and the remaining seven from the 2014–15 Hoofdklasse. As usual, the competition was divided into two leagues: "Saturday" and "Sunday", who differed by the day their games were usually played.

For this season only, the first 7 teams from the Saturday and Sunday divisions earned promotion to constitute a new, semi-professional third-division Tweede Divisie. This change in the league system was approved in a KNVB assembly in December 2014. Thus, the Topklasse and leagues below it decremented by one level, and furthermore, promotion and relegation between the Tweede Divisie and the Topklasse became effective from next season. From next season the Topklasse carries the name Derde Divisie and competes as the fourth division.

Teams

Saturday league

Sunday league

League tables

Saturday league

Sunday league

Promotion play-off

Championship final
The Saturday and Sunday champions play a two-legged final for the overall amateur championship. Both division champions will be promoted to the Tweede Divisie.

Excelsior won overall Topklasse title 4-3 on aggregate.

Derde Divisie / Hoofdklasse play-offs
Both for the Saturday and Sunday leagues applies the same systematic.

The team ranked 15th in the Topklasse and the 3 period winners of the 3 Hoofdklasse leagues (9 teams), making a total of 10 teams participate in the play-offs. The 10 teams are paired up to play a 1-round 2 leg knockout system. The 5 winners play next season in the 2016–17 Derde Divisie and the 5 losers in the 2016–17 Hoofdklasse.

Saturday

Source:

Sunday

Source:

Season Statistics

Top scorers

Up to and including matches played on 14 and 16 April 2016.

References 

Derde Divisie seasons
Neth
3